Iván Rodrigo Piris Leguizamón (born 10 March 1989) is a Paraguayan footballer who plays as a full-back for Club Libertad.

Club career

Cerro Porteno
Piris spent three years at Cerro Porteño, playing a particularly large role in the club's run to the semi-finals of the 2011 Copa Libertadores. His performances in the competition alerted clubs around the world of his ability, and it looked unlikely that he would stay with Cerro Porteño. He eventually signed for Brazilian club São Paulo FC for a fee of alleged €2 million. São Paulo signed Piris on a two-year loan deal on 19 July 2011 from a proxy club Deportivo Maldonado.

São Paulo
Piris joined up with his new teammates after the 2011 Copa América after São Paulo announced his signing on Thursday 15 July.

Roma
On 1 August 2012, Piris was loaned to Italian side Roma for a fee of €700,000, with the option of purchasing his rights at the end of the 2012–13 season for €4 million. He was virtually ever-present in the side under Zdeněk Zeman but, following the arrival of Aurelio Andreazzoli, he found playing time more difficult to come by, having to compete with Vasilis Torosidis.

Sporting Lisbon
Piris signed with Sporting on loan for the 2013–14 season.

Udinese
Piris returned to Italian Serie A for Udinese in August 2014. According to La Gazzetta dello Sport it was a loan, but according to Lega Serie A, it was a definitive deal from Deportivo Maldonado.

Monterrey

International career
Piris was part of Paraguay's 2011 Copa América runners-up side. He played in the semi-final victory over Venezuela, as well as the 3–0 loss to Uruguay in the final.

Honours
Paraguayan League 2009-A

References

External links

1988 births
Living people
Sportspeople from Asunción
Paraguayan footballers
Paraguayan expatriate footballers
Paraguay international footballers
Paraguay under-20 international footballers
Paraguayan Primera División players
Cerro Porteño players
Campeonato Brasileiro Série A players
São Paulo FC players
Serie A players
A.S. Roma players
Udinese Calcio players
Primeira Liga players
Sporting CP footballers
Liga MX players
C.F. Monterrey players
Newell's Old Boys footballers
Argentine Primera División players
2011 Copa América players
2015 Copa América players
Copa América Centenario players
2019 Copa América players
Expatriate footballers in Argentina
Expatriate footballers in Brazil
Expatriate footballers in Italy
Expatriate footballers in Portugal
Expatriate footballers in Mexico
Paraguayan expatriate sportspeople in Portugal
Paraguayan expatriate sportspeople in Brazil
Paraguayan expatriate sportspeople in Italy
Association football fullbacks
Paraguayan people of Italian descent